William Clapp may refer to:
 William J. Clapp (1857–1934), American attorney and educator
 William H. Clapp (1879–1954), American painter and art curator
 William F. Clapp (1880–1951), specialist in mollusks at Harvard University's Museum of Comparative Zoology
 Bill Clapp, social entrepreneur, philanthropist and business executive
 Will Clapp (born 1995), American football center

See also
 William Clapp House, a historic house in Dorchester, Massachusetts